365 Days TV is a Russian historian channel. It is owned by the Gazprom-Media. The channel is described as "the first Russian history television channel". It has won the Hot Bird TV Awards prize thrice (2006 – The Best Dynamically Developing Channel, 2008 – Culture and Education, 2010 – The Best Documentary TV Channel). The channel is included into basic package of the NTV Plus.

See also 
Viasat History
History

References

Documentary television channels
Television channels in Russia
Television channels and stations established in 2006